Vosbles-Valfin is a commune in the Jura department of eastern France. The municipality was established on 1 January 2018 and consists of the former communes of Valfin-sur-Valouse and Vosbles.

See also 
Communes of the Jura department

References 

Communes of Jura (department)